Vinelink.com (VINE) is a national website in the United States that allows victims of crime, and the general public, to track the movements of prisoners held by the various states and territories. The first four letters in the websites name, "vine", are an acronym for "Victim Information and Notification Everyday". Vinelink.com displays information, based on the information provided by the various states' departments of correction and other law enforcement agencies, on whether an inmate is in custody, has been released, has been granted parole or probation, or has escaped from custody. In some cases, the website will reveal whether a defendant has been granted parole or probation, but then subsequently violated conditions of their release and become a fugitive. Information provided on Vinelink.com represents metadata, in that the website lists a defendant's custody status; but does not list what the individual is charged with, their criminal history, or the amount of their bail, if applicable.

Internet users accessing the Vinelink.com website choose from a map of states and provinces within the United States where they wish to perform a search for an inmate. The user may then search for an individual using the inmate's or parolee's name, or by entering the inmate's specific department of corrections inmate number, if known. When the inmate's custody status changes, users who have registered to be notified of such changes will be notified via email, phone or both. This information is currently released upon request, without the website requesting reasons for the users search or requiring payment, as public records available to the general public.

Inmate information is available for most states, and for Puerto Rico, on the website. The states of Arizona, Georgia, Massachusetts, Montana, New Hampshire and West Virginia provide very limited information on the site. The states of Maine and South Dakota do not participate in the VINE system. The website does not provide data on prisoners detained by the Federal Bureau of Prisons which has its own inmate locator web site nor for inmates of the U.S. military prisons.

References

External links
 Official website

See also
 Visit the official Federal Bureau of Prisons website to search for inmates being held by the United States Federal Bureau of Prisons.

Data management
Government services web portals in the United States
Law enforcement websites
Metadata
Public records